Fonds-Verrettes is a commune in the Croix-des-Bouquets Arrondissement, in the Ouest department of Haiti. It has 40,224 inhabitants and lies adjacent to the Dominican Republic–Haiti border.

References

Populated places in Ouest (department)
Communes of Haiti